Ricardo Moreno Cañas  (May 8, 1890 – August 23, 1938) was an assassinated Costa Rican physician and congressman.  

He was killed by Beltrán Cortés, shot to death reportedly due to an unsuccessful surgery Moreno performed on him.

He is a historical personality revered and prayed to religiously by the local population.

References 

1890 births
1938 deaths
Costa Rican murder victims
People murdered in Costa Rica
Assassinated Costa Rican politicians
University of Geneva alumni
1930s murders in Costa Rica
1938 crimes in Costa Rica
1938 murders in North America
Victims of serial killers